Turbo japonicus is a species of sea snail, a marine gastropod mollusk, in the family Turbinidae.

Description
(Described as Turbo cernicus) The solid, subventricose, imperforate shell has an ovate conic shape. Its color pattern is yellowish, longitudinally flammulated. The acute spire is elevated. The convex whorls are sloping above, minutely obliquely striate, encircled by wide flattened ribs, alternating with smaller. The body whorl is obtusely angulated above, lightly depressed above the angle, and scarcely canaliculate. The aperture is circular. The acute lip is scalloped. The thick columella is convex, slightly arcuate and slightly produced at base, and longitudinally plicated.

The operculum is very convex outside. It is green, suffused with bright reddish brown, and conspicuously granulose.

Distribution
This species occurs in the Indian Ocean off Mauritius and Réunion; also in the Central Pacific.

References

japonicus
Gastropods described in 1848